Bernhard Luginbühl (16 February 1929 – 19 February 2011) was a Swiss sculptor.

He created iron sculptures in the late 1950s. In 1976 he started with building giant wooden sculptures which he set on fire as an art event.

References

External links

 Bernhard Luginbuehl Stiftung . Retrieved June 8, 2016.
 Iron giant's garden - installation
 

1929 births
2011 deaths
20th-century Swiss artists
21st-century Swiss artists
20th-century Swiss sculptors
21st-century Swiss sculptors
Swiss contemporary artists
Nouveau réalisme artists
20th-century sculptors
Modern sculptors
20th-century Swiss male artists